Isabella Sophie Tweddle (born 27 May 1999), who performs under the stage name Billie Marten, is a British singer-songwriter and musician from Ripon in North Yorkshire. She first came to prominence at the age of twelve when a video on YouTube of her singing attracted thousands of views.  She released her first EP at the age of fifteen in 2014, and her second EP a year later. At the end of 2015 she was nominated for the Sound of 2016 award.

Early life
Isabella (or "Billie") Tweddle was born 27 May 1999 in Ripon in North Yorkshire. She began playing guitar and singing when she was seven or eight, and started writing songs soon afterwards. By the age of nine she had her own YouTube channel on which she posted covers of pop songs, mostly for the benefit of her grandparents who live in France. When she was twelve she performed some music sessions for a local YouTube channel called Ont' Sofa. Among the songs she performed was a cover version of Lucy Rose's "Middle of the Bed", which quickly received thousands of views. In a later interview Marten said "I didn't understand how quickly it could spread. I was super young and it was crazy." She was educated at Ripon Grammar School.

Music career
In May 2014, just before her fifteenth birthday, Billie Marten released the single "Ribbon" via Burberry's curation program. She wrote the single with Fiona Bevan the previous year. According to Marten, one theme of "Ribbon" is "the elusiveness of the city, and how quickly you can lose something amongst the people and tube stations." In June 2014 she released her debut EP Ribbon. In August 2014 Marten played the BBC Introducing stage at the Reading Festival. She described her music in December 2014 as "a mix between acoustic and quite folky and a little indie."

In January 2015 Billie Marten signed to Chess Club Records, a division of Sony Music and their RCA Records recording label. She released the single "Heavy Weather" in April 2015 which premiered on Huw Stephens' BBC Radio 1 show. A 7" vinyl version of "Heavy Weather" was released in May with her cover version of Royal Blood's "Out of the Black" on the B-side. She released the single "Bird" in September 2015. She wrote the song with Olivia Broadfield, and according to Marten, the song is about "how words can truly affect people, not always for the right reasons". She toured for the first time in October 2015 as the supporting act for Lucy Rose. Marten released her second EP As Long As in November 2015.

In November 2015 she was nominated for the BBC Sound of 2016.

In 2018 Marten's Blue Sea, Red Sea featured as Annie Mac's hottest record on Radio 1.

In January 2021, Marten announced her third album titled Flora Fauna, set for a 21 May release.

In January 2023, she announced her fourth studio album titled Drop Cherries. Marten expressed that the title alludes to dropping everything to express your love for a person. The album will be released on April 7, 2023.

Personal life
Marten likes alpacas and has expressed a wish to buy one. She has said "I have this weird obsession with alpacas, I can't explain it. I think they're beautiful and I love them".

When aged 18, Marten was diagnosed with severe seasonal affective disorder (SAD), causing some depression and anxiety.

Discography

Studio albums

Extended plays

Singles

Music videos

Awards and nominations

References

External links
Official website

1999 births
Living people
British child singers
English women singer-songwriters
People from Ripon
People educated at Ripon Grammar School
21st-century guitarists
21st-century English women singers
21st-century English singers
21st-century women guitarists